Frank Samuel Eastman (27 April 1878 – 12 October 1964) was a British artist who painted mainly portraiture and landscapes. Eastman was born in London. He studied at the Croydon School of Art and Royal Academy Schools. He graduated from the Royal Academy of Arts in January 1904.

References

External links

38 Drawings of Nudes, Frank Samuel Eastman, Harvard Art Museums

1878 births
1964 deaths
19th-century English painters
English male painters
20th-century English painters
Painters from London
20th-century English male artists
19th-century English male artists